The Battle of Göllheim was fought on 2 July 1298 between the forces of duke Albert I of Habsburg (German: Albrecht) and king Adolf of Nassau over the prince electors' decision, without electoral act, to dethrone Adolf and proclaim Albert the new king. Adolf died in the battle.

Background

After the death of Rudolph I at Germersheim on 15 July 1291, his son Albert I was to be the most suitable successor to the throne of the Holy Roman Empire. However, Albert's undignified personality (ubiquitously called "Albert the One-Eyed", due to an open eye socket from a battle injury;) and his bad attitude dismayed the prince electors. Mostly, though, they feared too strong a kingship of the son of former king Rudolph I, who controlled one of the strongest domestic power bases in the empire. At the Imperial Diet near Frankfurt the following year, they resolved to elect Adolf of Nassau-Weilburg, a cousin of one of the electors, a man with very little domestic power. Although Albert publicly recognized Adolf's election with good grace, he was driven by irreconcilable anger and plotted against him. Once king, Adolf of Nassau-Weilburg was determined to forge his own power base and attempted to seize Thuringia and Meissen from the Wettins. As he had repeatedly abused his royal prerogative, Adolf was – without electoral process – declared banished by the electors. Adolf, however, defending his royal rights, went on campaign against the Austrian.

Albert had already followed the Archbishop of Mainz's (one of the electors) request, to move to the Rhine and engage Adolf, who, however opposed Albert's troops with a strong army of his own. Prior to the decisive battle, near Ulm and Breisach Albert avoided the troops of Adolf, who intended to stop him marching west. Albert then advanced north through the Upper Rhine valley towards Mainz. Albert's army included contingents from the Habsburg territories, Hungary, Switzerland and those of Henry II, Prince-Bishop of Constance, summoned at the fortified city of Alzey and seized the castle. Albert received the news of Adolf's deposition on June 23, 1298.

Adolf approached from the imperial city of Worms, in order to relieve Alzey Castle. His forces consisted of contingents from the Taunus, Adolf's home region, the Electoral Palatinate, Franconia, Lower Bavaria, Alsace and St. Gallen.

Battle

Albert initially avoided a collision, but then on July 2, 1298 deployed his troops in a strategically favorable position on the Hasenbühl, a hill near Göllheim.

Johannes von Geissel describes the exact course of the battle in his 1835 monograph The Battle of Hasenbühl and the King's Cross at Göllheim. The battle was fought in three engagements and lasted from the morning until the early afternoon. The battle remained undecided for many hours and, even after Adolf's death, did it not end immediately. The third engagement proved to be decisive. Adolf, who is said to have rushed to attack, was possibly slain by a Raugrave named Georg. Thereupon a large part of Adolf's army dissolved and fled, others continued to fight until they learnt about Adolf's death. According to Geissel's monograph, 3,000 battle horses perished on the losing side, while the winners fared not much better.

The result of the battle was generally considered as a judgment of God. Nevertheless, Albert insisted on a formal election by the electors, which took place in Frankfurt on July 27, 1298. As the kingship returned to the Habsburgs, the conflicts of interest between the electors and the king continued.

Adolf's widow, Imagina of Isenburg-Limburg, saw her husband's coffin transferred from Rosenthal Abbey to Speyer Cathedral by emperor Henry VII in 1309. There he was buried alongside his rival Albert, who had been murdered in 1308 by his own nephew Johann. Imagina had a memorial cross erected on the battlefield near Göllheim, which was designed in the early Gothic style. In the 19th century a chapel was built around it, and it has been preserved to this day.

References 

 Wheatcroft, Andrew (1996) The Habsburgs, Penguin Books.

External links 

1298 in Europe
Gollheim
Gollheim
Göllheim
Göllheim
Gollheim